Sutatausa is a municipality and town of Colombia in the Ubaté Province, part of the department of Cundinamarca.

Etymology 
The name Sutatausa comes from Chibcha and means "small tribute".

History 
The area of Sutatause before the Spanish conquest was inhabited by the Muisca, organised in their loose Muisca Confederation. Sutatausa was ruled by the zipa based in Muyquytá.

Modern Sutatausa was founded on June 24 (Saint John's day), 1537 by Hernán Pérez de Quesada, brother of conquistador Gonzalo Jiménez de Quesada, who on the same day founded Tenza.

Economy 
Main economical activities of Sutatausa are agriculture, dairy farming and small-scale mining. Tourism is also an important factor of income.

Gallery

References 

Municipalities of Cundinamarca Department
Populated places established in 1557
1557 establishments in the Spanish Empire
Muisca Confederation
Muysccubun